is a tiny village on the English-Welsh border,  west of Oswestry on the B4580 road. It lies partly in the Shropshire parish of Oswestry Rural; the other part is in Montgomeryshire, Powys.

History 

 is an old Welsh village in the Welsh Marches. Archaeological research has found evidence of Roman settlements and early Anglo-Saxon settlement within 10 km of the modern village. The name is Welsh, meaning Ford of the Crosses.

19th century
The former Rectory was built in 1840 from the local stone for £1260, which sum included constructing the church and village school, now the village hall, into the bargain. The church is in Wales, the Rectory is in England, the only such instance in modern times.

The first Rector was the Reverend Robert Williams, appointed in 1837. A native of Conwy, where his father was the Vicar, he was educated at Christ Church, Oxford (MA). He was a renowned scholar of his time, who wrote the Biography of Eminent Welshmen and the Cornish Dictionary. In 1835, whilst curate of Llangernyw, he published The History and Antiquities of the town of Aberconwy. In 1879, Reverend Williams left to become the Rector of Culmington, near Ludlow, where he died in 1881.

He was described as "ponderous and pedantic, big and burly, waddling as he walked with three or four pupils at his heels". The 1861 census gives details of his household. He had two sisters, a dairymaid, a housemaid and two farm servants living in. One of his favourite sayings was that "a goose is a very awkward bird, being a little too much for one, but not enough for two". He was a dull preacher, using the same sermons over and over, reading them in a monotone. He was not much liked by his parishioners, and maintained a congregation of as many as a dozen worshippers.

Two more vicars followed; the Reverend Richard Richardson-Jones from 1879 until 1908, and the Reverend William Arthur Morris until 1949. Both were rather more popular figures, and congregations regularly reached 100 or more.

20th century
In 1920, the Church in Wales was disestablished and a referendum was held in the village to decide if the Church should go to Church of England or Church in Wales. The vote was in favour of the Church of England, and so it is to this day, one of the few Church of England churches actually situated in Wales. The church continues to hold regular services.

In 1951 the Rectory was sold by the church into private hands, and bought by a dentist and his family. First hand accounts indicate that the house was always cold and almost totally without carpets. Water was pumped from a well and up to five fires had to be laid and lit each morning to provide any warmth at all. The place was, at times, in a state of near collapse.

It was not until 1981 that the then owners opened the Rectory's doors to the public, first as a restaurant and subsequently as a hotel. The village school is now the village hall, and has been substantially extended recently due to the high level of local activities held there.

Pantomime 

 is well known locally for its pantomimes, which are hosted every year in January and February at the Village Hall with the cast made up of people from the local area. The group in 2016 has performed for over 36 years, making a new show each year.

In literature
Rhydycroesau is the setting for some of the key action in the medieval mystery novel Monk's Hood by Ellis Peters, the third in her series featuring Brother Cadfael, set in 1138.

References

External links 

Local History Initiative page for Rhydycroesau
Rhydycroesau Village Hall
Rhydycroesau Show

 Pen-y-Dyffryn Hotel

Villages in Shropshire
Villages in Powys